Abdul Karim Irgashive (sometimes spelled Ergashev) is a citizen of Tajikistan who was held in extrajudicial detention in the United States Guantanamo Bay detention camps, in Cuba.

The Department of Defense reports that he was born on May 7, 1965, in Dushanbe, Tajikistan and assigned him the Internment Serial Number 641.Abdul Karim Irgashive was transferred to Tajikistan on July 17, 2004.

Attempt to sue for compensation

On July 22, 2007, Irgashive attempted to sue President Bush for his unjustified extrajudicial detention in Guantanamo.
Ergashev described himself as a political refugee, who had been staying in a refugee camp in Afghanistan, when the Americans initiated the American aerial bombardment of Afghanistan.
The Ferghana Information Agency reports:

The Ferghana Information Agency reports that Ergashev claims he acquired Hepatitis C in Guantanamo, and had his gall bladder removed without explanation.

References

External links
 Tajikistan: ex-Guantánamo prisoner plans to sue President Bush Andy Worthington

1965 births
Living people
Guantanamo detainees known to have been released
Tajikistani extrajudicial prisoners of the United States